Stella May Henderson (25 October 1871 – 1 March 1962) was a New Zealand feminist, university graduate and journalist. She was the first woman parliamentary reporter for a major New Zealand newspaper.

Stella moved to Australia in 1903 with her husband, who became employed by the Melbourne Argus. In 1907 the newspaper commissioned Allan to write articles for the Australian Women's Work Exhibition in October, the first of its kind. She adopted the pen name "Vesta" and began writing a column for the paper called "Women to Women", spanning a whole range of women's issues and community welfare. She succeeded Ada Cambridge as president of the Women Writers' Club, and in 1912 she helped found the Lyceum Club, later becoming its president.

In 1939 Henderson retired to England and wrote for The Argus on women's and children's experiences of World War II. In 1947 she returned to Melbourne and lived there until her death in 1962. Several of Henderson's siblings were also notable, Elizabeth became New Zealand's first woman Member of Parliament, and Christina was a teacher and social activist.

Early life and education 
Henderson was born in Kaiapoi, North Canterbury, New Zealand on 25 October 1871. She was the seventh of nine children of Alice and Daniel Henderson. The family spent some years living in Ashburton, but when Henderson was 11 the family moved to Christchurch.

She attended Christchurch Girls' High School while Helen Connon was principal, and won a Junior Scholarship to Canterbury College in 1888. She completed both a Bachelor of Arts degree and a Master of Arts degree, graduating with first class honours in English and Latin in 1893.

Henderson was initially interested in a career in law, although women were not permitted to practise law at the time. With the help of William Izard, who employed her, she began working in a law firm while attending classes at Canterbury College. Izard subsequently approached the local Member of Parliament, G.W. Russell, to introduce a private member's bill to Parliament to enable women to qualify as barristers and solicitors. The legislation, the Female Law Practitioners Act, was passed in 1896 and Henderson passed her final L.L.B exams in 1898.

Throughout this period, Henderson was developing her political views. She and her sisters Elizabeth and Christina joined a socialist group, as well as the National Council of Women, and signed the petition for women's suffrage that won New Zealand women the vote in 1893. All three sisters were also strong supporters of the Prohibition movement, as their father Daniel had died when the family was still young due to alcoholism.

Career 
Just as Henderson was about to begin a career in law, she was offered a position as parliamentary correspondent for the Lyttelton Times newspaper. Her speeches and papers for the small political group she was involved with had been fully reported on for some time in the newspaper, and it was the editor, Samuel Saunders, who offered her the position. Saunders wrote to the president of the Press Gallery committee to inform him that the seats allocated to his newspaper in the gallery and the press room would be used by Henderson. However, the president asked the members of the gallery to vote on whether a woman should be allowed to join them, and members voted against her admittance. Unperturbed, Henderson bought a permanent ticket to the Ladies Gallery at Parliament and proceeded to write notes on her knees, write reports in the ladies tearoom, and telegraph her reports to her editor each evening. The male reporters continued to vocally oppose Henderson's presence, but her employers complained that their exclusion of her from the Press Gallery restricted their right to hire whomever they chose as their parliamentary reporter. The National Council of Women also supported Henderson; they approached the Speaker of the House, Sir Maurice O'Rorke, and pressured him to allow Henderson into the Press Gallery.

After intervention from the Reporting and Debates Committee of the House, a section of the Ladies Gallery was converted into a press gallery for her use. Henderson continued to report from parliament for two years. She resigned her position on her marriage, as her new husband was a reporter for a conservative newspaper while the Lyttelton Times supported the Liberals. The couple felt they could not both continue to report for such politically opposed publications.

Instead, Henderson became New Zealand correspondent for the Brisbane Courier newspaper and in 1903 the couple moved to Melbourne. The following year, Henderson began working for the paper The Argus. Initially she wrote book reviews, and in 1907 was commissioned to write a series of articles on the first Australian Women's Work Exhibition. In 1908 she began writing a weekly column called "Woman to Woman" under the pen-name "Vesta", in which she gave advice and information on community issues and women's and children's issues. Henderson also joined the Women Writers' Club there, and was one of three women founding members of the Australian Journalists' Association. In 1912 she helped found the Lyceum Club, later becoming its president.

In 1939 Henderson retired to England and wrote for The Argus on women's and children's experiences of World War II. In 1947 she returned to Melbourne and lived there until her death in 1962.

Vesta Place, in the Canberra suburb of Gilmore, is named in her honour.

Personal life and family 
In 1900 Henderson married Edwin Frank Allan, who was a writer at the Evening Post newspaper. They had four daughters Helen Mary, Frances Elizabeth, Stella Patricia Grace and Alice Margaret.

References

1871 births
1962 deaths
New Zealand feminists
New Zealand political journalists
People from Kaiapoi
People educated at Christchurch Girls' High School
University of Canterbury alumni
19th-century New Zealand lawyers
20th-century New Zealand journalists
New Zealand emigrants to Australia
Australian journalists
New Zealand activists
The Argus (Melbourne) people
New Zealand women lawyers